Dimitrije Bjelica (born November 8, 1935) is a Serbian (formerly Yugoslav) chess FIDE Master. He has organised many big events and was the arbiter at tournaments like Linares. Chess historian Edward Winter has noted that Bjelica's books are rife with misspellings and sometimes contain plagiarized material.

Bjelica claims to have played a record-breaking 56 games of blindfold chess in a May 25, 1997 simultaneous exhibition (+51 −1 =4) at Igalo, near Herceg Novi. However, Eliot Hearst and John Knott write:The Exhibition was played at the International Congress of Nurses and his opponents were all woman nurses. The game he lost was to his mother, at that time more than 80 years old. ... Bjelica reports that the exhibition lasted seven hours and that in several games his version of chess, Chess for Peace, was used, in which the bishops standing initially on f1 and f8 were replaced by pawns. He told us that none of his opponents had chess ratings but "some of them were very good." ... Tellingly and surprisingly, he admitted that he was permitted to write down whatever he liked during the exhibition ... .

Bjelica has written numerous books and articles on chess and has interviewed many leading players.

References

Books 

 Reyes del Ajedrez

External links 
 

1935 births
Living people
Serbian chess players
Yugoslav chess players
Serbian non-fiction writers
Chess arbiters
Serbian chess writers
Chess FIDE Masters